Sokol Prenga (born 24 May 1971) is an Albanian former footballer who played as a midfielder. He made seven appearances for the Albania national team from 1995 to 1997.

References

External links
 

1971 births
Living people
Sportspeople from Tirana
Albanian footballers
Association football midfielders
Albania international footballers
FK Dinamo Tirana players
KF Tirana players
Flamurtari FC players
TSV Hartberg players
KF Teuta Durrës players
FK Partizani Tirana players
Albanian expatriate footballers
Albanian expatriate sportspeople in Austria
Expatriate footballers in Austria